Bob Johannes Carolus de Jong (born 13 November 1976) is a Dutch former speed skater who specialized in long distances: five and ten kilometers.

Speed skating career
In 2006, he won the gold medal for the ten kilometer race at the Olympic Games in Turin, with a personal record of 13:01.57, beating world record holder Chad Hedrick and Carl Verheijen. He also skated in the men's 5000 m event and placed 6th. In 1998, he won the silver medal in the men's 10,000 m and 4th in the men's 5000 m. In 2010, he won the bronze medal in the men's 10,000 m. and in his fifth Olympics in 2014 he took his second Olympic Bronze in 10,000 m event.

After winning a bronze medal in the 10,000 m at the 2010 Olympic Games, de Jong, at age 37, won another bronze medal at the 2014 Olympic Games in Sochi in the 10,000 m becoming the oldest male competitor in 86 years to win speed skating medal at the Olympics.

Records

Personal records

Source: SpeedskatingResults.com

De Jong has a score of 149.086 on the adelskalender. His highest ranking was 4th between 17 March 2001 and 20 October 2001.

World records

World records skated at sea level venues (unofficial)

Tournament overview

 WD = withdrew
 NC = no classification
 DQ = disqualified
 DNS = did not start
source:

World Cup

 * = 10000 meter
Source:

Medals won

References

External links

 
 Personal records
 Bob de Jong at SpeedSkatingStats.com
 Bob de Jong at SchaatsStatistieken.nl 
 
 
 

1976 births
Dutch male speed skaters
Speed skaters at the 1998 Winter Olympics
Speed skaters at the 2002 Winter Olympics
Speed skaters at the 2006 Winter Olympics
Speed skaters at the 2010 Winter Olympics
Speed skaters at the 2014 Winter Olympics
Olympic speed skaters of the Netherlands
Medalists at the 1998 Winter Olympics
Medalists at the 2006 Winter Olympics
Medalists at the 2010 Winter Olympics
Medalists at the 2014 Winter Olympics
Olympic medalists in speed skating
Olympic gold medalists for the Netherlands
Olympic silver medalists for the Netherlands
Olympic bronze medalists for the Netherlands
World record setters in speed skating
People from Kaag en Braassem
Living people
World Single Distances Speed Skating Championships medalists
Sportspeople from South Holland
20th-century Dutch people
21st-century Dutch people